Mario Ignacio Larenas Díaz (born 27 June 1994) is a Chilean footballer that currently plays for Primera División de Chile club C.D. Antofagasta and the Chilean national U20 team.

References

External links
 
 

1994 births
Living people
Chilean footballers
Unión Española footballers
Cobreloa footballers
Chilean Primera División players
Chile under-20 international footballers
Association football defenders